John C. McFarland (1840 – October 3, 1881) was a sailor in the United States Navy and a recipient of the Medal of Honor for his actions in the Battle of Mobile Bay during the American Civil War.

Biography
Rated captain of the forecastle, he had the station at the wheel in every engagement in which Hartford participated. During the Battle of Mobile Bay 4 and August 5, 1864. McFarland left his sickbed to take up station, keeping the wheel of Admiral David Farragut's flagship throughout the storm of shell and shot. He was commended by his commanding officers for his fortitude and intelligence and was awarded the Medal of Honor for his gallant and meritorious service.

McFarland died on October 3, 1881, at the age of 41.

Namesake
 was named for him.

Medal of Honor citation

Rank and Organization:
Captain of the Forecastle, U.S. Navy. Born: 1840, Boston, Mass. Accredited to: Massachusetts. G.O. No.: 45, December 31, 1864.

Citation:
Stationed at the wheel on board the flagship U.S.S. Hartford during successful action against Fort Morgan, rebel gunboats and the ram Tennessee in Mobile Bay, on 5 August 1864. With his ship under terrific enemy shellfire, McFarland performed his duties with skill and courage and, when the Lackawanna ran into his ship and every man at the wheel was in danger of being crushed, remained steadfast at his station and continued to steer the ship.

See also

 List of Medal of Honor recipients
 List of American Civil War Medal of Honor recipients: M–P

Notes

References

 
 
 

1840 births
1881 deaths
Union Navy sailors
United States Navy Medal of Honor recipients
United States Navy sailors
American Civil War recipients of the Medal of Honor
People from Lowell, Massachusetts
People from Boston
People of Massachusetts in the American Civil War